Townsville Sports Precinct is a multi-use stadium located in Townsville, Australia. With redevelopments completed in early 2022, the venue now offers three indoor multipurpose courts, multiple fields and athletics facilities with a main stadium capacity of 4000 spectators.

Notable rugby league games
The results were as follows;

References

External links
Official Website of Northern Fury
Fox Sports Pulse page

Northern Fury FC
Rugby league stadiums in Australia
Rugby union stadiums in Australia
Soccer venues in Queensland
Sports venues in Townsville